The Ursa Major Arc or UMa Arc is a faint arc of gas seen in the constellation of Ursa Major, about 60° diameter and 30° long. It exists as compressed, energized interstellar gas about 600 light years away and probably formed by supernova explosion about 100,000 years ago. It was discovered accidentally in images from the Galaxy Evolution Explorer, identified as ultraviolet emissions. It is too faint to be seen except with special equipment.

References

 Discovery of a 30-degree-long ultraviolet arc in Ursa Major Astronomy&Astrophysics Volume 636, April 2020 arxiv.org 7 Apr 2020
 Astronomers discover 30 degree arc of ultraviolet emission centered on the Big Dipper June 3, 2020

See also 
 Barnard's Loop

Emission_nebulae